Dania Hall may refer to:

 Dania Hall (Minneapolis), a cultural center and performing arts space
 Dania Hall (Racine, Wisconsin), a historic gathering place